Currant Creek is a stream in eastern Juab County and southern Utah County in northern Utah, United States.

Description
From its source the creek runs north‑northwest though the marsh area. Within the marsh area, the creek flows through several unnamed ponds and joins with several other unnamed streams (with headwaters that are just east and west of the source of Currant Creek). Continuing north, it flows just west of and is fed by the Burriston Ponds. Just west of the ponds is Currant Creek's confluence with West Creek. Still further north it passes west of the city of Mona and, just before entering the Mona Reservoir (also known as Mount Nebo Reservoir), passes under Goshen Canyon Road (formerly State Route 214 (1941-1953).

On the northwest side of the Mona Reservoir (which is also fed by several unnamed streams) the creek passes through the dam (with a spillway elevation of ) and then continues northwest through the Goshen Canyon. A short way down the canyon, the creek passes back under Goshen Canyon Road. Midway through the canyon the creek leaves Juab County and enters Utah County. The creek then continues flowing northwest from the canyon through the Goshen Valley until it reaches its confluence with Kimball Creek and then enters the Goshen Reservoir. Immediately north of the reservoir, the creek passes under U.S. Route 6.

Tributaries
In addition to numerous unnamed springs and streams that contribute to Currant Creek, there are two named tributaries.

West Creek
West Creek, the first named tributary of Currant Creek, is a stream located in eastern Juab County. After entering the Juab Valley, the creek continues its northerly course along the west side of the valley to pass under State Route 132.

Orme Spring
Orme Spring, is spring in eastern Juab County.

Kimball Creek
Kimball Creek, the other named tributary of Currant Creek, is an intermittent stream and is located in southern Utah County. The creek and the canyon then head northeast to the mouth of the canyon on the southwest end of the Goshen Valley.

See also

 List of rivers of Utah

Notes

References

External links

Rivers of Utah
Wasatch Front
Rivers of Juab County, Utah
Rivers of Utah County, Utah
Tributaries of Utah Lake
Wasatch Range